Chris Chancellor (born December 22, 1986) is a former American football defensive back for the Jacksonville Jaguars of the National Football League. He was signed by the Cleveland Browns as an undrafted free agent in 2010. He played college football at Clemson.

Jacksonville Jaguars
Chris was signed to the Jacksonville Jaguars in 2010 after a brief stint with Cleveland Browns and retired in 2011.

Personal life
He attended Miami Edison Senior High School in Miami, Florida. He attended Miami Edison Senior High School with the late Jasper Howard who was a cornerback for the Connecticut Huskies football team He is now a police officer in Clemson, South Carolina. He is known in the town as a down to earth guy. He was also named as Clemson 2016 police officer of the year.

External links
 Jacksonville Jaguars Bio

References

1986 births
Living people
Players of American football from Florida
American football cornerbacks
American football safeties
Clemson Tigers football players
Clemson University alumni
Cleveland Browns players
Jacksonville Jaguars players